World Achva Association is an Orthodox Jewish secret society, which was founded in 1895 and aims to mutual assistance and real existence of the Mitzvah "Love your neighbor as yourself".

The world head bureau is located in Jerusalem from the association establishment to the present.

Establishment and goals 
First Bureau of the Association was founded in Jerusalem to unify with Israel, develop the education, improve the morals of the people and help the needy. Among other things, requested the Association to help friends, called "Brothers," on the one hand they are very moral but on the other financially weak. Help included assistance in finding jobs, and providing credit.

Fraternity brothers are divided into four different levels, ranging from 'trainees' are "following siblings learn the theory of brotherhood" to 'educate' they "There are those who go to the fraternity of complete self-forgetfulness. They have no calculates interest on themselves when they give their hands brotherhood, not later, not any time any day, but always they feel only the second and always are willing to give themselves and dedicate themselves for the other. few are unique individuals but this fraternity Hasmonean. role of these brotherhood serve as a symbol to others and play are without intention special role of educators".

Association Activity
After the establishment of the branch in Jerusalem, opened branches in Jaffa, Tel Aviv, Safed, Tiberias, Hebron, Petah Tikva, Haifa, New York City and London.

In recent decades, the association activity in Israel almost completely diminished and most of the activities currently being branches in Australia, England, Argentina, United States, Brazil, South Africa, France and Canada.

Achva neighborhood
In 1905 suggested that some members of the Neighborhood Association to establish themselves in Jerusalem, and in 1906 was purchased in the name of two members of the Association nationals Ottoman A, Land to build Achva neighborhood. Neighborhood construction work was entrusted to the members of the Association of Contractors Abraham Hamburger and in-law Jacob Moses from, and two years later established neighborhood. The neighborhood is located between the neighborhoods of Jerusalem Zichron Moshe and the Street Kings of Israel.

Book of regulations to establish the neighborhood stated: "We have come to the Soviet drive us the seat change and twenty houses, a house and a yard each, with synagogue built as loud to the Torah and to the prayer ... and called colony name Rates brotherhood, for the will We name a good sign that this project will have as big gate wide open".

In 1899 Achva neighborhood was founded in Jaffa, south-west of Neve Tzedek and to the Neve Shalom, initiated by Elijah Aharon Kahana.

In 1905, the Association Talmud Torah in Jaffa has been established which joined with the Bible study little secular. They called the place "brotherly room" and many of the local Haredi community supported him. In 1908 studied the eighty students. Administrator Heder appointed Dr. Joseph Halevi Seliger great support of Jaffa - Rabbi Abraham Isaac Kook. The name of the institution changed to "Tachkemoni", and prepared a plan which included studies - SECONDARY.

External links
Official Website

Mutual organizations
Esotericism
Jewish organizations based in Israel
1906 establishments in the Ottoman Empire
Organizations based in Jerusalem
Secret societies
Religious organizations established in 1895